Francesco Lisi (Rome, 3 September 1989) is an Italian footballer who plays for Perugia in Serie B.

Club career
He made his professional Lega Pro Prima Divisione debut in 2011–12 season with Piacenza. He spent the first 10 seasons of his senior career in the third tier or below.

For the 2019–20 season his club Pisa advanced to the second-tier Serie B.

He made his Serie B debut for Pisa on 23 August 2019 in a game against Benevento. He started the game and played the whole match. He scored his first Serie B goal on 28 September 2019 in a 1–1 draw with Venezia.

On 13 July 2021, he signed a three-year contract with Perugia.

References

External links
 

1989 births
Footballers from Rome
Living people
Italian footballers
Association football midfielders
F.C. Aprilia Racing Club players
Piacenza Calcio 1919 players
A.C. Rodengo Saiano players
Como 1907 players
A.S. Bisceglie Calcio 1913 players
Rimini F.C. 1912 players
S.S. Juve Stabia players
Pisa S.C. players
A.C. Perugia Calcio players
Serie B players
Serie C players
Serie D players